A referendum on becoming a republic was held in Bulgaria on 8 September 1946. Although considered unconstitutional according to the Tarnovo Constitution still active at the time, the result was 95.6% in favour of the change, with voter turnout reported to be 91.7%. The country was declared to be the People's Republic of Bulgaria on 15 September 1946, formally putting an end to the Kingdom. On the following day the de jure head of state, King Simeon II and his mother, Queen Giovanna, were forced to leave the country, although the queen wanted to leave Bulgaria after the execution of Prince Kiril on 1 February 1945. After the referendum, a republican constitution (known as the Dimitrov Constitution) was introduced the following year.

According to the Tarnovo Constitution, no such referendum was admissible, as it did not envisage a change of the state system. The only way it could be changed was by convening a Grand National Assembly, and this could only take place by a decision of the monarch.

Results

References

Bulgaria
1946 in Bulgaria
Referendums in Bulgaria
Constitutional referendums
Monarchy referendums
September 1946 events in Europe